Mount Konzhakovskiy Kamen is a mountain in the northern Urals, Sverdlovsk Oblast, Russia.

The Great Soviet Encyclopedia describes Konzhakovskiy as "mountain massif" of height 1,569 m. Its constitution is pyroxenites and dunites of lower and middle Paleozoic era. The slopes are covered with conifers with some birch up to 900–1000 m, with alpine tundra above.

See also
List of highest points of Russian federal subjects

References and notes

Mountains of Sverdlovsk Oblast
Highest points of Russian federal subjects